List of rivers in Kentucky (U.S. state).

By drainage basin
This list is arranged by drainage basin, with respective tributaries indented under each larger stream's name.  All rivers in Kentucky flow to the Mississippi River, nearly all by virtue of flowing to its major tributary, the Ohio River. Also listed are some important tributaries to the few Kentucky rivers that originate in, or flow through, other states.

Mississippi River
Obion Creek
Mayfield Creek
Ohio River 
Goose Creek
Massac Creek
Tennessee River
Clarks River
Blood River
Cumberland River 
Little River
Red River
Obey River (Tennessee)
Wolf River
Big South Fork of the Cumberland River
Rockcastle River
Laurel River
Clear Fork
Tradewater River
Green River
Panther Creek
Pond River
Rough River
Mud River
Barren River
Gasper River
Little Reedy Creek
Big Reedy Creek
Bear Creek
Nolin River
Little Barren River
Russell Creek
Salt River
Rolling Fork
Beech Fork
Chaplin River
Floyds Fork
Beargrass Creek
Little Kentucky River
Kentucky River 
Eagle Creek
Elkhorn Creek
Benson Creek
Dix River
Cedar Creek
Hickman Creek
Silver Creek
Red River
North Fork Kentucky River
Middle Fork Kentucky River
Troublesome Creek
South Fork Kentucky River
Goose Creek
Red Bird River
Taylors Creek
Licking River 
Banklick Creek
South Fork Licking River
Townsend Creek
North Fork Licking River
Kinniconick Creek
Tygarts Creek
Little Sandy River
Big Sandy River
Blaine Creek
Levisa Fork
Paint Creek
Russell Fork
Tug Fork
Blackberry Creek

Alphabetically 
Banklick Creek
Barren River
Beargrass Creek
Beaver Creek (Kentucky)
Beech Fork of the Salt River
Big Sandy River
Blackberry Creek
Blood River
Cassidy Creek
Cedar Creek
Chaplin River
Clarks River
Clear Creek (Kentucky)
Clear Fork
Cruises Creek
Cumberland River
Defeated Creek (Knott County, Kentucky)
Defeated Creek (Letcher County, Kentucky)
Dix River
Dreaming Creek
Dry Creek (Kentucky)
Drennon Creek
Eddy Creek
Elkhorn Creek
Floyds Fork of the Salt River
Gasper River
Green River
Hickman Creek
Kentucky River
Laurel River
Lawrence Creek (Kentucky)
Levisa Fork of the Big Sandy River
Licking River
Little Barren River
Little Kentucky River
Little River
Little Sandy River
Lynn Camp Creek
Massac Creek
Middle Fork Kentucky River
Mississippi River
Mistaken Creek
Mud River
Nolin River
North Fork Kentucky River
Ohio River
Paint Creek
Pond River
Red Bird River
Red River (eastern Kentucky)
Red River (western Kentucky)
Rockcastle River
Rolling Fork of the Salt River
Rough River
Russell Fork of the Big Sandy River
Salt Lick Creek (Kentucky)
Salt River
Sap Branch
Silver Creek
Sinking Creek (Breckinridge County, Kentucky)
Sinking Creek (Jessamine County, Kentucky)
South Fork Kentucky River
Squabble Creek
Tearcoat Creek
Tennessee River
Tradewater River
Tug Fork of the Big Sandy River
Tygarts Creek
Wolf River

References 
USGS Geographic Names Information Service
USGS Hydrologic Unit Map – State of Kentucky (1974)

See also
List of rivers in the United States

Kentucky rivers
List
Rivers